Bert Stedman (born March 6, 1956) is a Republican member of the Alaska Senate. A fourth generation Alaskan, he was born in Anchorage and spent his childhood between Petersburg and Sitka. He was appointed by Governor Frank Murkowski in November 2003 to the Alaska Senate to represent District A. He now represents District R following redistricting in 2012.

Stedman co-chaired the Senate Finance Committee for six years from 2007 to 2012, and again in 2019. Politically heterodox, Stedman opposed reforms to Alaska's oil tax under Republican governors Sarah Palin and Sean Parnell. Following the precipitous drop in oil prices, Stedman advocated a more fiscally conservative approach to the state's budgeting in 2015.

References

External links
 
 Alaska State Legislature - Senator Bert Stedman official government website
 Alaska Senate Majority official caucus page
 Alaska Senator Bert Stedman official constituency website
 
 Bert Stedman at 100 Years of Alaska's Legislature

1956 births
Republican Party Alaska state senators
Borough assembly members in Alaska
Living people
Politicians from Anchorage, Alaska
People from Sitka, Alaska
21st-century American politicians
People from Petersburg Borough, Alaska